Hans Jacob "Jakken" Biørn Lian (born 31 March 1942) is a Norwegian diplomat.

He was born in Oslo and was educated at University of Neuchâtel. He started working for the Norwegian Ministry of Foreign Affairs in 1967. He headed the Norwegian delegation that negotiated the Treaty on Conventional Armed Forces in Europe. He was then a deputy under-secretary of state in the Ministry of Foreign Affairs from 1992 to 1994, the Norwegian ambassador to the United Nations in New York City from 1994 to 1997, and Norway's Permanent Representative to NATO from 1997 to 2002. From 2002 to 2004 he was a special advisor of the Minister of Foreign Affairs, tasked with monitoring the Middle East peace process. From 2005 to 2010 he was the Norwegian ambassador to Israel.

References

1942 births
Living people
Diplomats from Oslo
Ambassadors of Norway to the United States
Ambassadors of Norway to Israel
Permanent Representatives of Norway to the United Nations
Permanent Representatives of Norway to NATO